Pak Huijin (December 4, 1931 – March 31, 2015) was a South Korean poet.

Life
Pak Huijin was born in Gyeonggi Province in Korea in 1931, during the period of Japanese colonial rule. In 1956 at the age of 25, three of his poems were recommended to the arts journal Literary Art (문학예술), thus beginning his formal career as a poet. His love of literature, however, was apparent from a very young age. He recalls that when he was asked as a primary school student about his dream for the future, he answered unhesitatingly, "to become a writer." Due to the colonial circumstances of the time, he spoke and wrote in Japanese, and because his first encounters with literature were in Japanese, he was greatly interested in Japanese novels and poetry, especially the haiku.

Pak attended Korea University, where he majored in English, and worked as a teacher at Tongseong Junior High and High School. He was a member of the Sahwajip literary club in the 1960s, and also a member of the poetry reading club Space.

Pak Huijin, who remained single his entire life, admitted in his own words, "I married poetry." He refrained from participation in writers' groups which often fell into the snares of political ideology, rather devoting himself to the perfecting of his poetic art. He has boasted that he "made real contributions to the literary coterie magazine movement in Korea," and also had great pride as the poet "who first truly experimented with the poetry recitation movement." Defining poets as those who are "insanely in love with words," he emphasized that poets "must pour every ounce of their effort into language".

Career
Pak Huijin's poetry starkly contrasts heaven and earth and contradictions between light and darkness. Following Korea's liberation from Japan, Pak engrossed himself in writing poetry in his mother tongue. At first his Korean was inelegant, but he strove to create his own poetic world, drawing upon artistic trends from both inside and outside Korea. Having majored in English literature at university, Pak was heavily influenced by Romantic poets like T.S. Eliot and W.B. Yeats, as well as the German poet Rainer Maria Rilke and the French poet Paul Valéry. Pak also received great inspiration from traditionalist Korean poets, such as his contemporaries, the renowned Seo Jeong-ju and Yu Chi-hwan, as well as Jo Jihun, Pak Mok-wol and Pak Dujin, both of whom wrote traditional nature poetry.

Unusually for modern Korean poets, Pak Huijin also wrote traveling poems, primarily as a result of his extensive travel in the United States and Europe.

Works

Works in translation
 Himmelsnetz
 Sunrise Over the East Sea

Works in Korean (partial)
 Chamber Music (1960)
 The Bronze Age (1965)
 Smiling Silence (1970)
 Beneath the Seoul Sky (1979)
 Three Hundred and Fourteen Four-Line Poems (1982)
 The Stream in My Heart (1982)
 Dreams in Iowa (1985)
 Lovers in the Lilacs (1985)
 Poet, Be a Prophet! (1985)
 The Song of Scattered Petals (1988)
 The Azaleas of Bukhan Mountain (1990)
 300 Four-Line Verses (1991)
 The Buddha in the Lotus Blossom (1993)
 The Pines at Morundae (1995)
 Seven Hundred One-Line Verses (1997)
 A Hundred Views at a Hundred Temples (1999)
 Spiritual Songs of the Hwarang (1999)
 Twenty Views from Tong River (1999)
 Sky, Earth, Human (2000)
 Bak Huijin's World Travel Poetry Collection (2001)
 Four Hundred Four-Line Verses (2002)
 Nine-Hundred and Sixty One-Line Verses and Seven Hundred and Thirty Seventeen-Word Verses, and More (2003)
 Tamna Island as It Dreams (2004)

Awards
 Woltan Literary Award (1976)
 Prize of Modern Poetry (1988)
 Poetry Prize of the Korean Poets' Association

References 

1931 births
South Korean male poets
2015 deaths
20th-century South Korean poets
International Writing Program alumni
20th-century male writers